Alfaroa hondurensis is a species of plant in the Juglandaceae family. It is endemic to Honduras.

References

hondurensis
Endemic flora of Honduras
Taxonomy articles created by Polbot